Bruce William Boxleitner (born May 12, 1950) is an American actor and science fiction and suspense writer. He is known for his leading roles in the television series How the West Was Won, Bring 'Em Back Alive, Scarecrow and Mrs. King (with Kate Jackson), and Babylon 5 (as John Sheridan in seasons 2–5, 1994–98).
He is also known for his dual role as the characters Alan Bradley and Tron in the 1982 Walt Disney Pictures film Tron, a role which he reprised in the 2003 video game Tron 2.0, the 2006 Square-Enix/Disney crossover game Kingdom Hearts II, the 2010 film sequel, Tron: Legacy and the animated series Tron: Uprising. He co-starred in most of the Gambler films with Kenny Rogers, where his character provided comic relief.

Early life
Boxleitner was born on May 12, 1950 in Elgin, Illinois. He attended Prospect High School in Mount Prospect, Illinois, and the Goodman School of Drama at the Art Institute of Chicago (now at DePaul University).

Career

Television

Boxleitner is best known for his leading roles in the television series How the West Was Won, Bring 'Em Back Alive, Scarecrow and Mrs. King (with Kate Jackson and Beverly Garland), and Babylon 5 (as John Sheridan in seasons 2–5, 1994–98).

He also starred in The Gambler (as Billy Montana, alongside Kenny Rogers: 1980, 1983 and 1987) and in such television films as Judith Krantz's Till We Meet Again and Danielle Steel's Zoya. In 2005, he co-starred as Captain Martin Duvall in Young Blades. He has also starred in several films within the Babylon 5 universe, including Babylon 5: In the Beginning (TV, 1998), Babylon 5: Thirdspace (TV, 1998), Babylon 5: A Call to Arms (TV, 1999), and the direct-to-DVD Babylon 5: The Lost Tales (2007).

Boxleitner has appeared in many other TV shows, including an appearance in 1973 as Rick Welsh, a University of Minnesota Track Star, in the season four episode, "I Gave at the Office" in The Mary Tyler Moore Show. Other appearances include Gunsmoke, Tales from the Crypt, Touched by an Angel, The Outer Limits and She Spies, and in 1982, he played Chase Marshall in the TV film Bare Essence, with Genie Francis. He was a member of the cast of Heroes for seasons three and four, playing New York Governor Robert Malden in three episodes. He also appears on the television series Chuck as the father of Devon Woodcomb. He was in such made-for-television films as The Secret, Hope Ranch, Falling in Love with the Girl Next Door, Pandemic, Sharpshooter and Aces 'N' Eights.

Boxleitner was a guest-star on NCIS in the fall of 2010. He played Vice Admiral C. Clifford Chase, a high-ranking Navy official. Boxleitner also lends his voice to the animated version of his iconic character Tron in the animated series Tron: Uprising. The series premiered on Disney XD on June 7, 2012. He also reprises the character Alan Bradley/Tron from the films Tron and Tron: Legacy. From 2013 to 2015, he played Bob Beldon, the owner of the local bed and breakfast, in the Hallmark Channel series Cedar Cove.

Boxleitner later recurred on Supergirl portraying Baker, the Vice-President of the United States who is later sworn in as the new president after Lynda Carter's character Olivia Marsdin is outed as a Durlan by Mercy Graves and Otis Graves. He gained the role after Brent Spiner stepped down due to a scheduling conflict related to a family matter.

From 2019, Boxleitner had a recurring role on the Hallmark Movies & Mysteries series of films The Matchmaker Mysteries.

Film

He has also appeared in several films, including Tron (in which he played the title role) and The Baltimore Bullet (1980) with James Coburn. He reprised his role in the Tron sequel Tron: Legacy and in the video game Tron: Evolution which was released alongside the film Tron: Legacy, as he did for sequel video game named Tron 2.0, and Disney/Square Enix crossover video game Kingdom Hearts II. Boxleitner also voiced Col. John Konrad in video game Spec Ops: The Line. He also starred as Confederate General James Longstreet in the 2003 film Gods and Generals. He provides the voice of Colin Barrow in the animated science fiction horror film Dead Space: Downfall, based on the video game Dead Space. Other films he has been in include Kuffs, The Babe, Brilliant, Snakehead Terror, Legion of the Dead, King of the Lost World, Shadows in Paradise and Transmorphers: Fall of Man.

In 2011, he officially announced that he will reprise his role as Alan Bradley/Tron in Tron 3. July 2015 Boxleitner said that he is done with the franchise, as "it's been too up and down for me. I would rather not just keep going. I don't want to repeat my career anymore."

Modeling
From 1986 to 1989, Boxleitner appeared in advertisements for Estee Lauder's "Lauder For Men".

Novels
Boxleitner is credited as the author of two science fiction novels with a Western setting, Frontier Earth (1999) and Searcher (2001).

Audio books
Boxleitner played a major role in the audio dramatization of The Great Secret, part of the Golden Age of Fiction series by L. Ron Hubbard. He also played Captain Gavin Blaire in the unabridged version of World War Z.

Personal life
Boxleitner's first marriage was to American actress Kathryn Holcomb, who co-starred with him on How The West Was Won as his on-screen sister Laura. They had two sons together.

Boxleitner's second marriage was to American actress Melissa Gilbert. They have a son born in 1995. Gilbert also guest-starred as Boxleitner's on-screen wife, Anna Sheridan, during Season 3 of Babylon 5. On March 1, 2011, Gilbert announced that she and Bruce had separated after 16 years of marriage. On August 25 of the same year, it was reported that Gilbert had filed for divorce.

In 2003, Boxleitner was appointed to the Board of Governors of the National Space Society, a nonprofit, educational space advocacy organization founded by Dr. Wernher von Braun.

He was friends with actress Beverly Garland for nearly 30 years. He met her on an episode of How The West Was Won, and later co-starred alongside her on Scarecrow & Mrs. King, though he had very few scenes with her. Then, in 1986, Boxleitner presented Garland the Golden Boot Award. After the cancellation of Scarecrow, Boxleitner remained close to Garland, contacting her consistently, until her death, on December 5, 2008. He said in an interview, "I used to keep up with Beverly Garland until she passed. There was actually a hotel named after her. She was such a trip. She was a great lady."

Bruce is currently married to publicist Verena King.

Filmography

Film

Television films

Television series

Video games

References

External links

 
 
 

1950 births
20th-century American novelists
20th-century American male writers
21st-century American novelists
Male actors from Illinois
American male film actors
American male novelists
Audiobook narrators
American science fiction writers
American male television actors
American male voice actors
American male video game actors
Living people
People from Elgin, Illinois
21st-century American male writers